Raju Eknath Gaikwad (born 25 September 1990) is an Indian footballer who plays as a defender for Churchill Brothers in the I-League. Gaikwad primarily plays as a centre back, but can also play as a full back and is a long throw specialist.

Career

Pailan Arrows
After spending time at Tata Football Academy Gaikwad signed for Pailan Arrows (then AIFF XI) in the I-League. He made his league debut for the club on 3 December 2010 against Prayag United at the Salt Lake Stadium which was also Pailan Arrows's first ever game in the I-League; Pailan lost 2–1.

East Bengal
In July 2011 Gaikwad signed for East Bengal after one season at Pailan and made his debut for the club on 4 February 2012 after missing the first few months of the season through injury.

Mohun Bagan A.C.
In June 2015 Gaikwad signed for Mohun Bagan from rival club East Bengal.

Kerala Blasters
Kerala Blasters signed Raju as a replacement for Sandesh Jhingan in the 2019–20 ISL season.

International
Gaikwad made his debut for the India U23 on 23 February 2011 against Myanmar's U23s in the 2012 Olympic Qualifiers; India U23 won 2–1. He then made his senior debut for India on 21 March 2011 in the 2012 AFC Challenge Cup qualifiers against Chinese Tapei at the MBPJ Stadium in Petaling Jaya, Malaysia; India won 3–0. Gaikwad then won his first championship with India on 11 December 2011 when he helped India beat Afghanistan in the 2011 SAFF Cup. Gaikwad then went on to lead India to win the 2012 Nehru Cup when India managed to beat Cameroon's B team on 2 September 2012 at the Nehru Stadium in the Indian capital, Delhi.

Career statistics

Club

National team statistics
Statistics accurate as of 6 May 2015

Honours

India
 SAFF Championship runner-up: 2013
 Nehru Cup: 2012

East Bengal
Federation Cup: 2012
Calcutta Football League: 2011–12, 2012–13, 2013–14, 2014–15
IFA Shield (1): 2012

Mohun Bagan
Federation Cup: 2015–16

Churchill Brothers
Baji Rout Cup runner-up: 2022

References

1990 births
Living people
Indian footballers
I-League players
Footballers from Mumbai
India international footballers
India youth international footballers
Indian Arrows players
East Bengal Club players
Mumbai City FC players
Indian Super League players
Association football central defenders
Footballers at the 2010 Asian Games
Asian Games competitors for India
Kerala Blasters FC players
FC Goa players
Mohun Bagan AC players
Jamshedpur FC players